Imanuel HS Lalthazuala (born 26 September 1994) is an Indian professional footballer who plays as a defender for Aizawl in the I-League.

Career
Born in Mizoram, Lalthazuala has been with Aizawl since 2011, helping them to promotion to the I-League in 2015. He scored the winning goal for Mizoram in the 2015 National Games. His strike was the only one separating Mizoram and Punjab in the final.

Lalthazuala made his professional debut for Aizawl in the I-League on 9 January 2016 against the reigning champions, Mohun Bagan. He only played 37 minutes before coming off as Aizawl lost 3–1.

Career statistics

Club

References

External links 
 Aizawl Football Club Profile.

1994 births
Living people
Indian footballers
Aizawl FC players
Association football defenders
Footballers from Mizoram
I-League players
I-League 2nd Division players